Samuel Goldman (1882–1969) built a house on Fellowship Farms in Piscataway Township, New Jersey in 1915. In 1934, he organized the Anarchist Federation of America.

See also
Ferrer Colony and Modern School

References

1882 births
1969 deaths
American anarchists
American sculptors